The Young Citizen Volunteers refers to either: 

 Young Citizen Volunteers (1912)
 Young Citizen Volunteers (1972)